Augustus Allen may refer to:
 Augustus Allen Hayes (1806–1882), American chemist
 Augustus Chapman Allen (1806–1864), American founder of the city of Houston, Texas
 Augustus F. Allen (1813–1875), American politician
 Augustus N. Allen (1868–1958), American architect